Tilhar  Assembly constituency is  one of the 403 constituencies of the Uttar Pradesh Legislative Assembly,  India. It is a part of the Shahjahanpur  district and one of the five assembly constituencies in the Shahjahanpur Lok Sabha constituency. First election in this assembly constituency was held in 1957 after the "DPACO (1956)" (delimitation order) was passed in 1956. After the "Delimitation of Parliamentary and Assembly Constituencies Order" was passed in 2008, the constituency was assigned identification number 133.

Wards  / Areas
Extent  of Tilhar Assembly constituency is KC Badagaon of Powayan Tehsil; KCs Tilhar,  Nigohi & Tilhar MB of Tilhar Tehsil.

Members of the Legislative Assembly

Election results

2022

2017

2012

See also

Shahjahanpur district
Shahjahanpur Lok Sabha constituency
Sixteenth Legislative Assembly of Uttar Pradesh
Uttar Pradesh Legislative Assembly
Vidhan Bhawan

References

External links
 

Assembly constituencies of Uttar Pradesh
Shahjahanpur district
Constituencies established in 1956